WCBD-TV (channel 2) is a television station in Charleston, South Carolina, United States, affiliated with NBC and The CW Plus. Owned by Nexstar Media Group, the station has studios on West Coleman Boulevard (SC 703) in Mount Pleasant, and its transmitter is located in Awendaw, South Carolina.

History
The station signed on the air as WUSN-TV on September 25, 1954. The station was originally owned by Drayton Hastie. It aired an analog signal on VHF channel 2 and was originally an NBC affiliate with a secondary ABC affiliation. Hastie sold the station to Reeves Telecom in 1960. It shared ABC programming with WCSC-TV until 1962, when WCIV signed on and took the NBC affiliation. WUSN then became a full-time ABC affiliate. During the late-1950s, it was also briefly affiliated with the NTA Film Network. In 1971, Reeves then sold Channel 2 to State Telecasting Company, based in the state capital of Columbia. On November 8, 1971, the station adopted its current call letters, WCBD standing for Charleston, Berkeley, and Dorchester counties (the three counties in the Charleston metropolitan area), calls also taken to coordinate with new sister station KCBD in Lubbock, Texas. Media General bought the station from State Telecasting in 1983.

In May 1994, Great American Communications announced that it would sell four of its six television stations to New World Communications, who would subsequently announce an affiliation agreement with Fox. Two of the stations that were involved in the deal were ABC affiliates WBRC in Birmingham, Alabama and WGHP in High Point, North Carolina. Fox was unable to purchase the two stations outright; both of them were placed in a blind trust and were sold directly to Fox in early 1995. While WGHP was able to switch to Fox in September 1995 (taking the affiliation from WXLV-TV, which affiliated with ABC), Fox had to run WBRC as an ABC affiliate for a little over a year, as that station's affiliation contract with ABC did not expire until August 31, 1996. In January 1996, ABC reached a groupwide affiliation agreement with Allbritton Communications, who had acquired WCIV in 1978; Allbritton would purchase CBS affiliates WCFT-TV in Tuscaloosa and WJSU-TV in Anniston (making them full-power satellites of Birmingham's replacement ABC affiliate, WBMA-LP, which began operations as independent station W58CK in November 1994). The affiliation deal caused WCIV and WB affiliate WBSG (now WPXC-TV) in Brunswick, Georgia to become ABC affiliates; the latter became a satellite of Jacksonville affiliate WJXX when it signed on in February 1997. As a result of the affiliation deal, WCBD became an NBC affiliate for the second time in its history on August 19, 1996, fifteen days after that year's Olympic Games (which were carried by WCIV locally) ended.

On January 27, 2016, Media General announced that it had entered into a definite agreement to be acquired by Nexstar Broadcasting Group for $4.6 billion. The combined company would be called Nexstar Media Group and own 171 stations (including WCBD-TV). The deal was completed on January 17, 2017.

WCBD-DT2
WCBD-DT2 is the CW-owned and operated second digital subchannel of WCBD-TV, broadcasting in 720p high definition on channel 2.2.

WCBD-DT2 is branded on-air as Lowcountry CW 14 based on its standard definition cable channel position on the main local provider, Comcast Xfinity (which also carries the subchannel in high definition on channel 1003), along with DirecTV. The subchannel is also carried on WOW! channel 12 and Dish Network channel 50.

History
WCBD launched their second digital subchannel on September 18, 2006 to be Charleston's affiliate of The CW, which was made up of the newly-merged UPN and WB networks. It took the channel 14 slot previously held by its cable-only WB predecessor, which effectively dissolved all operations entirely with the launch of WCBD-DT2.

The previous history of The WB in Charleston saw that network being carried exclusively on cable through "WBLN", an affiliate of The WB's smaller-market The WB 100+ Station Group and run by Coastal Media & Broadcasting and Cox Communications from September 21, 1998 until the network's end in September 2006, and was located on channel 14 on most cable systems. Before WBLN's launch, the network originated on both WGN's national feed and WCTP (the current-day WCIV) in January 1995, which changed its calls to WBNU to fit their new affiliation. In January 1997, WBNU signed an affiliation agreement with UPN and changed their calls to WMMP after a change in ownership, staying with that network until September 2006 when they affiliated with MyNetworkTV; the short gap in 1997 saw viewers receive WB programming only from Superstation WGN before WBLN and the WB 100+ system launched.

In 2013, WCBD-DT2 began broadcasting in 720p high definition, in line with The CW's request for its subchannel-only affiliates to carry the network in HD wherever technically possible.

Programming

Syndicated programming
Syndicated programming on WCBD includes The Drew Barrymore Show, Access Daily, Wheel of Fortune, and Jeopardy!.

WCBD-DT2 programming
Though most of WCBD-DT2's schedule is taken up by the default CW Plus schedule, Sunday mornings feature the locally originated outdoors programs Santee Cooper Sportsman with Kevin Davis and SC Outdoors, along with local church services.

Newscasts
WCBD spent most of the 1970s and 1980s in last place until Media General bought the station in 1983. Since then, it has been a solid runner-up to longtime leader WCSC. WCBD offers more than 30 hours of news per week. Each newscasts focus on WCBD's signature elements that have become a staple in the Lowcountry: "Storm Team 2," "CrimeTracker," "2 Your Health," "Cool School/Cool Teacher of the Week," "Count on 2 Sports," "Count on 2 Traffic" and "Count on 2 Investigators."

WCBD airs a newscast Saturday nights at 7, but unlike WCSC and WCIV, does not offer a broadcast at the same time on weeknights. The first HD telecast was on July 29, 2012, making it the last Lowcountry station to go HD. WCBD started a weekend morning newscast that airs on Saturday and Sunday at 9:00 a.m. In addition to its main studios, WCBD also operates a bureau located on Assembly Street/SC 48 covering the Capitol in Columbia, an operation shared by its sister Nexstar stations in and around the state.

WCBD-DT2 has two original newscasts produced by WCBD: News 2 at 7 on the CW weekday mornings, and WCBD News 2 at 10pm on The CW on weeknights. Previously, it carried a repeat of the 6 p.m. edition.

Notable current on-air staff
Rob Fowler (NWA and AMS Seals of Approval) – chief meteorologist

Notable former on-air staff
Amy Robach – later with ABC News
Jon Robinson – 2004–2006

Technical information

Subchannels
The station's digital signal is multiplexed:

Analog-to-digital conversion
WCBD-TV shut down its analog signal, over VHF channel 2, on June 12, 2009, as part of the federally mandated transition from analog to digital television. The station's digital signal remained on its pre-transition UHF channel 50, using PSIP to display WCBD-TV's virtual channel as 2 on digital television receivers.

See also
Channel 2 virtual TV stations in the United States
Channel 20 digital TV stations in the United States

References

WCBD About Us

External links

The CW Charleston

Television channels and stations established in 1954
1954 establishments in South Carolina
CBD-TV
NBC network affiliates
Ion Television affiliates
Laff (TV network) affiliates
Nexstar Media Group